William (Wilhem) Nylander (3 January 1822 – 29 March 1899) was a Finnish botanist and entomologist. Nylander was born in Oulu, and taught at the University of Helsinki before moving to Paris, where he lived until his death in 1899. 

Nylander studied medicine, receiving a degree in 1847. Nylander pioneered the technique of determining the taxonomy of lichens by the use of chemical reagents, such as potassium hydroxide, tinctures of iodine and calcium hypochlorite, still used by lichenologists as the K and C tests.
        
Nylander was the first to realise the effect of atmospheric pollution on the growth of lichens, an important discovery that paved the way for the use of lichens to detect pollution and determine the cleanness of air. His brother Fredrik Nylander was also a botanist.

References

1822 births
1899 deaths
19th-century Finnish botanists
Finnish mycologists
Finnish lichenologists
Finnish entomologists
People from Oulu
Finnish taxonomists